Gaijin Entertainment is a Hungarian video game developer and publisher headquartered in Budapest. The company is mostly known for War Thunder, Crossout, Star Conflict, CRSED: F.O.A.D. (formerly known as Cuisine Royale) and Enlisted.

History 
Gaijin Entertainment was founded in Russia in 2002 by Anton and Kirill Yudintsev, whose first big project was the PC racing game Adrenaline. After the successful launch of War Thunder in 2012, an office in Germany was established, to manage global operations and marketing. The company moved their distribution business from Moscow to Budapest around 2015, and their development headquarters followed shortly after. According to Hungarian tax records, Gaijin had 27 employees in Hungary by January 2021.

Presently, all Gaijin online games are operated from Germany, Cyprus and Hungary, while the development is scattered across Europe. The company has now six offices in total: in Karlsruhe (Germany), Larnaca (Cyprus), Budapest (Hungary), Riga (Latvia), Dubai (UAE) and Yerevan (Armenia). The company has around 200 employees  split between those offices, with 60 of them based at the Hungarian HQ. While the company still hires people at Russian job websites, all their job listings are for candidates based in Hungary, Cyprus, Armenia, Georgia, Serbia or Montenegro.

Gaijin Entertainment group generated 2.6% of all the Hungarian Software Industry profit in 2020.

While Gaijin have produced a few single-player games in the 2000s, the company is now focused on free-to-play online titles. According to László Perneky, Gaijin's lead programmer, "Those who can decide on projects at the company mostly like to play multiplayer games".

Origin of company name 
Gaijin Entertainment name comes from the Japanese word for foreigner. According to Anton Yudintsev, he was dreaming to enter Japanese market one day while staying true to their roots as a European company and accept their position of an outsider there. Gaijin actually entered the Japanese market with the release of anime-style action game X-Blades in 2009. 

Gaijin's logo features snail that is a reference to Issa Kobayashi 's haiku:

O snail

Climb Mount Fuji

But slowly, slowly!

Games

Dagor Engine 
The Dagor Engine is a proprietary game engine used by Gaijin Entertainment in War Thunder, Enlisted, CRSED: F.O.A.D. and other titles. The original version of the engine was developed by Gaijin Entertainment and in 2005 the separate company Dagor Technologies was established for continued development. Currently the engine incorporates technology such as the PhysX physics engine and has been updated to version 6.5 since the release of War Thunder. Gaijin's Hungarian office is responsible for the further development of the engine.

Controversies 
The company gained notoriety for pursuing legal action against the owner of gaijin.com, an unaffiliated website that predates the company by seven years. The complaint expired and was automatically withdrawn in November 2013.

On 21 June 2020, porn actress Eva Elfie was sponsored by Gaijin's War Thunder, which sparked light controversy within the community. On 23 September 2022, an official Eva Elfie decal has been added to War Thunder, further strengthening relations between Gaijin and the porn actress.

In January 2021, after the logos of War Thunder and Crossout were seen in a video by Donbas YouTube channel "High Caliber Mayhem", Gaijin was accused of indirectly financing pro-Russian separatists in the war in Donbas. High Caliber Mayhem has denied any links to the separatist armed forces and published an explanation claiming that all the money from all advertisements on that channel were spent on humanitarian aid for civilians. The video showing the War Thunder advertisement was removed from High Caliber Mayhem's YouTube channel.

In response to the controversy, Gaijin stated "We do not provide political support to anyone anywhere. We know nothing about politics and prefer to stay out of it. Our agency that ordered an ad in the video in question took it down when they realized they might drag us into a political discussion."

References

External links 
 

Companies based in Budapest
Video game development companies
Video game publishers
Video game companies established in 2002
Video game companies of Hungary
Video game companies of Russia
Game engines that support Vulkan (API)